Three Sisters was launched in 1788 as a West Indiaman. In 1795 she made one voyage to Bengal for the British East India Company (EIC). She then returned to the West Indies trade and was lost in February 1799 on her way to Barbados from London.

Career
Three Sisters first appeared in Lloyd's Register (LR) in 1789. (LR for 1788 is not available online.)

Three Sisters sailed for Bengal on 30 August 1795.

At the time the EIC had a monopoly on trade between Great Britain and India or China. It is not clear why Three Sisters had EIC approval for the voyage. She is not among the vessels on the list of vessels that the EIC had chartered to bring rice back from Bengal on behalf of the British government. 

 

However, she was on an authorized voyage. She is listed among the vessels which had arrived in Britain with a cargo on behalf of the EIC.

Three Sisters, Graham Steel, master, left Bengal on 2 August 1796. She reached the Cape on 4 November and St Helena on 30 November; she was at Falmouth on 5 February 1797.

On her return from Bengal Three Sisters returned to the West Indies trade.

Fate
Lloyd's List reported that Three Sisters, Goodwin, master, was on her way from London to Barbados when she was lost in Orchard's Bay in the Isle of Wight. Three men had drowned.

Citations and references
Citations

References
 
 

1788 ships
Age of Sail merchant ships of England
Ships of the British East India Company
Maritime incidents in 1799